Druie Douglas Barnard Jr. (March 20, 1922 –  January 11, 2018) was a United States congressman from Georgia.

Biography
Barnard attended the Richmond County public schools and graduated from the Academy of Richmond County (Augusta, Georgia) in 1939. He attended Augusta College from 1939 to 1940, then graduated in 1943 with a Bachelor of Arts from Mercer University in Macon, where he became a member of the Phi Delta Theta fraternity. He served in the United States Army during World War II from 1943 to 1945 and became a technician two. He served in the 57th Finance Disbursing Unit and was stationed at Fort Benjamin Harrison, Indianapolis, Indiana as well as in the European theatre of World War II in England, France and Belgium. After serving in the military, he returned to Georgia and earned an Bachelor of Laws from the Walter F. George School of Law at Mercer University in 1948.

From 1948 to 1962, Barnard engaged in the banking profession, primarily at the Georgia Railroad Bank, a former local Augusta banking institution.  He was executive secretary to Georgia Governor Carl Sanders from 1963 to 1966, and a board member of the Georgia State Department of Transportation from 1966 to 1976.  He was a Democrat.

Barnard was a delegate to the Georgia State Democratic convention in 1962 and a delegate to the 1964 Democratic National Convention. He served in the United States House of Representatives from 1977 to 1993. On March 22, 1980, he addressed a crowd estimated to be between 200 and 300 people where he unveiled the Georgia Guidestones monument in Elberton. He explained that the monument was to guide future generations and that it should make Americans try to ecologically preserve the environment.

Doug Barnard was an active member of First Baptist Church in Augusta. He was married to Naomi Holt "Nopi" Bernard, a poet. Barnard died on January 11, 2018, in Augusta, Georgia. He had two daughters, one son, and 7 grandchildren.

Legacy
Georgia State Route 56 Spur, in Augusta, was named in his honor as the Doug Barnard Parkway.

See also

References

External links

"Doug Barnard, Jr." interview at the Veterans History Project

1922 births
2018 deaths
Politicians from Augusta, Georgia
United States Army soldiers
Military personnel from Georgia (U.S. state)
Augusta State University alumni
United States Army personnel of World War II
Georgia (U.S. state) lawyers
Mercer University alumni
Academy of Richmond County alumni
Democratic Party members of the United States House of Representatives from Georgia (U.S. state)
20th-century American lawyers